Vascular endothelial growth inhibitor (VEGI), also known as TNF-like ligand 1A (TL1A) and TNF superfamily member 15 (TNFSF15), is protein that in humans is encoded by the TNFSF15 gene. VEGI is an anti-angiogenic protein. It belongs to tumor necrosis factor (ligand) superfamily, where it is member 15. It is the sole known ligand for death receptor 3, and it can also be recognized by decoy receptor 3.

Function 

The protein encoded by this gene is a cytokine that belongs to the tumor necrosis factor (TNF) ligand family. This protein is abundantly expressed in endothelial cells, but is not expressed in either B or T cells. The expression of this protein is inducible by TNF-alpha and IL-1 alpha. This cytokine is a ligand for receptor TNFRSF25 (death receptor 3) and TNFRSF6B (decoy receptor 3). It can activate both the NF-κB and MAPK signalling pathways, and acts as an autocrine factor to induce apoptosis in endothelial cells. This cytokine is also found to inhibit endothelial cell proliferation, and thus may function as an angiogenesis inhibitor. An additional isoform encoded by an alternatively spliced transcript variant has been reported but the sequence of this transcript has not been determined.

Clinical relevance 

Several TNFSF15 SNPs have been found to be strongly associated with inflammatory bowel disease.

References

Further reading 

 
 
 
 
 
 
 
 
 
 
 
 
 
 
 
 
 

Cytokines